Inter-Action is an album by saxophonists Sonny Stitt and Zoot Sims recorded in Chicago in 1965 and released on the Cadet label.

Reception

Allmusic awarded the album 4½ stars calling it "consistently swinging".

Track listing 
All compositions by Sonny Stitt except where noted.
 "My Blue Heaven" (Walter Donaldson, George A. Whiting) - 8:01     
 "The Saber" - 3:06     
 "Katea" - 6:38     
 "Fools Rush In" (Rube Bloom, Johnny Mercer) - 5:29     
 "Look Down That Lonesome Road" (Traditional) - 7:20     
 "I Want to Go Home" - 4:24

Personnel 
Sonny Stitt - alto saxophone, tenor saxophone
Zoot Sims - tenor saxophone
John Young - piano
Sam Kidd - bass
Phil Thomas - drums

References 

1965 albums
Cadet Records albums
Sonny Stitt albums
Zoot Sims albums
Albums produced by Esmond Edwards